Rhinophis travancoricus, commonly known as the Travancore shieldtail or Tamil Nadu earth snake, is a species of uropeltid snake endemic to India.

Geographic range
It is found in southern India (Travancore, Trivandrum, Peermade, Ernakulam).

Type locality: "near Trevandrum, at the 6th mile-stone towards Vambayam".

Description
Dark purplish brown, scales on the sides and on the ventrum edged with whitish. Anal region black. Ventral surface of tail yellow.

Dorsal scales in 17 rows at midbody (in 19 rows behind the head). Ventrals 146; subcaudals 6.

Snout acutely pointed. Rostral slightly laterally compressed, not keeled, about ⅓ the length of the shielded part of the head. Nasals separated by the rostral. Eye in the ocular shield. No supraoculars. Frontal longer than broad. No temporals. No mental groove. Diameter of body 34 times in the total length. Ventrals about 1½ times the size of the contiguous scales. Tail ending in a large convex rugose shield, which is neither truncated nor spinose at the end. Caudal disc slightly shorter than the shielded part of the head.

Footnotes

Further reading

 Boulenger, G.A. 1893. Description of a new Earth-Snake from Travancore. J. Bombay Nat. Hist. Soc. 7 (3): 318, 1 Plate [1892].

External links
 

travancoricus
Reptiles of India
Reptiles described in 1892